Liz Clarke is an American sportswriter. Currently a sportswriter for The Washington Post, she has covered the sport of NASCAR for The Charlotte Observer, Dallas Morning News, USA Today and The Post.  She currently covers the Georgetown Hoyas men's college basketball team for the Washington Post.

Career
Over the course of her career, she has twice been honored as NASCAR's top print journalist with the Russ Catlin Award for Excellence in Motorsports Journalism (1996 and 2003).  Her first book, One Helluva Ride: How NASCAR Swept the Nation, was released on February 12, 2008. In the book, Clarke brings people closer to the sport and business of NASCAR.  Clarke chronicled NASCAR's transition from regional obsession to national phenomenon; while also profiling the sport's dynasties, the Allisons, Pettys and Earnhardts.

Clarke spent four seasons as a Washington Redskins beat writer for The Post, and has written extensively about the Olympics, tennis and college sports.

Clarke is also a weekly "side-chick" on The Tony Kornheiser Show, and serves as Mr. Tony's motorsports translator. She is an occasional panelist on Comcast SportsNet’s Washington Post Live, an interactive sports roundtable covering the stories, trends and topics in the news and on the minds of sports fans throughout the Mid-Atlantic area.

Education and personal life
A graduate of New York City’s Barnard College in 1983, Clarke lives in Washington, D.C.

References

Year of birth missing (living people)
Living people
American women sportswriters
Barnard College alumni
Place of birth missing (living people)
American women non-fiction writers
21st-century American women